The Charles City Community School District, or Charles City Schools is a public school district headquartered in Charles City, Iowa.

Occupying sections of Floyd and Chickasaw counties, it serves Charles City, Colwell, Floyd, and the surrounding rural areas.

Mike Fisher has been the superintendent since 2018, after serving as principal of Hoover Middle School in Waterloo.

Campuses
The district operates four schools, all located in Charles City: 
 Lincoln Elementary School
 Washington Elementary School
 Charles City Middle School
 Charles City High School

See also
List of school districts in Iowa

References

External links
 Charles City Community School District

School districts in Iowa
Education in Floyd County, Iowa
Education in Chickasaw County, Iowa